Joaquim Agostinho da Silva Ribeiro (born 15 September 1975 in Paços de Ferreira), known as Agostinho, is a Portuguese retired footballer who played as a winger.

He spent most of his professional career in Spain, playing 182 matches (with 18 goals) in the two major levels. In his country, without really settling anywhere, he represented five clubs, totalling only 63 appearances in the Primeira Liga.

Club career
After impressing as a youngster at Vitória Sport Clube in Guimarães, Agostinho moved abroad aged 20, but his first experience would be a very unhappy one, only appearing twice for Real Madrid Castilla and Sevilla FC combined. He would spend the following three seasons in the Spanish second division, consecutively with UD Salamanca, UD Las Palmas and Málaga CF; with the latter, in 1998–99, he teamed up with compatriot Edgar (also newly signed and also arrived from Real Madrid) to propel the Andalusians to La Liga, contributing with 38 matches and three goals.

Agostinho continued to appear significantly for Málaga in the following years, but also had an unassuming loan spell in France with Paris Saint-Germain FC, after which he was released in June 2002. His career was somewhat unnoticeable from then onwards, as he played mainly in Spain's and Portugal's second levels or with modest teams in the top flight, consecutively representing Moreirense FC, Polideportivo Ejido, F.C. Felgueiras and Rio Ave FC. He only played 14 competitive games in two full campaigns with the latter, and was released at the age of 32.

Agostinho then moved to the Portuguese third division with C.A. Valdevez, after which he again returned to Spain, joining CF Palencia in the fourth tier and helping it promote in his debut season. He left the club in June 2010 and retired shortly after, at nearly 35.

References

External links

1975 births
Living people
People from Paços de Ferreira
Portuguese footballers
Association football wingers
Primeira Liga players
Liga Portugal 2 players
Segunda Divisão players
Vitória S.C. players
Moreirense F.C. players
F.C. Felgueiras players
Rio Ave F.C. players
La Liga players
Segunda División players
Segunda División B players
Tercera División players
Real Madrid Castilla footballers
Sevilla FC players
UD Salamanca players
UD Las Palmas players
Málaga CF players
Polideportivo Ejido footballers
CF Palencia footballers
Ligue 1 players
Paris Saint-Germain F.C. players
Portugal youth international footballers
Portugal under-21 international footballers
Portuguese expatriate footballers
Expatriate footballers in Spain
Expatriate footballers in France
Portuguese expatriate sportspeople in Spain
Sportspeople from Porto District